Trawsgoed (Welsh for "Crosswood") is both a community and an estate in Ceredigion, Wales. The Vaughans are descended from Collwyn ap Tangno, founder of the fifth noble tribe of North Wales, Lord of Eifionydd, Ardudwy, and part of Llŷn, who had his residence on the site of Harlech Castle.

The land falls within the ancient parish of Llanafan, in the upper division of the hundred of Ilar. In Wales, an ancient parish was a village or group of villages or hamlets and the adjacent lands. Originally they held ecclesiastical functions, but from the sixteenth century they also acquired civil roles. The parish may have been established as an ecclesiastical parish. Originally a medieval administrative unit, after 1597 ecclesiastical units were separated from civil parishes to serve the ecclesiastical needs of the local community. The Trawsgoed estate extended over 22 Cardiganshire parishes, including Llanafan. The community of Trawsgoed has a population of 989 (2011) and includes the villages of Llanafan and Llanfihangel-y-Creuddyn.

History of ownership
The estate and mansion of Trawsgoed came into the Vaughan family by the marriage of Adda Fychan with Tudo, daughter and heiress of Ifan Goch of Trawsgoed, ‘Evan the Red'.

The founder of the modern estate was the parliamentarian and lawyer, Sir John Vaughan, who was made Chief Justice of the Common Pleas by Charles II. It was Sir John Vaughan who acquired from the Earl of Essex much of the former monastic lands of the Cistercian abbey Strata Florida. At the same time further land was added to the estate through his marriage to Jane Stedman, daughter of John Stedman of Ystrad Fflur and Cilcennin.

The estate has been passed down in the landed family from father to son in a direct line since it was acquired by marriage in 1200. The Vaughans are one of the few aristocratic families who have retained possession of a house since first taking it on in the Middle Ages.

Trawsgoed became an estate in the English sense of the word in the 16th century. Strata Florida Abbey, in the centre of Wales, was given to the 1st Earl of Essex to broker during the English Reformation and dissolution of the monasteries, and he sold much of it to the Stedman family. Sir John Vaughan married the Stedman heiress and his brother, Henry, her sister. So almost all the abbey estate was taken over by the Vaughans. In 1695, John Vaughan of Trawsgoed, the grandson of Sir John Vaughan, was created Viscount Lisburne in the peerage of Ireland. during the Civil War he married Malet, daughter of the poet and courtier, the Earl of Rochester, and granddaughter of the Cavalier, Sir Henry Wilmot, 1st Earl of Rochester, the victor of the Battle of Roundway Down.

The Vaughan family was granted the title Earl of Lisburne in 1776 and remained at Trawsgoed mansion over successive generations. The family at one time owned estates in Northumberland and at Mamhead in Devon. In 1947 the mansion house became the headquarters of the Ministry of Agriculture, Fisheries and Food in Wales, and the home farm is still occupied by the Biotechnology and Biological Sciences Research Council (BBSRC) and managed by the Institute of Grassland and Environmental Research (IGER).

Grounds
Sir Pryse Pryse of Gogerddan held 28,684, W.T.R. Powell of Nanteos held 21,933, John Waddingham of Hafod held . The Vaughan family has for many years worshiped at St Afan's Church, Llanafan, that lies within the estate. It was chosen as a special stage in the British Rally from 2006 to 2008. The pleasure gardens surrounding the house, and the wider park, are designated Grade II on the Cadw/ICOMOS Register of Parks and Gardens of Special Historic Interest in Wales.

Trawsgoed Mansion

Trawsgoed Mansion is a 17th-century country house, also known as Crosswood Park, formerly the seat of the Earl of Lisburne. It is a Grade II* listed building.

It was the 6th Earl of Lisburne who added the 50-room Victorian wing to the old Georgian mansion and built the summerhouse, squash and tennis courts, and the ornamental fountain. He also had the library ceiling painted in the style of those at Windsor Castle. The house eventually included seventy rooms, gardens with rare Chilean and Himalayan tree species that thrive in the mild moist climate of coastal Wales, a stable block, lodge house, and an unencumbered view of the Cambrian Mountains. There are the remains of a small Roman fort adjoining the grounds.

The mansion was sold in 2007 to the Edwards family, who spent five years restoring the house. Their work on Trawsgoed was featured on the television show The Restoration Man in 2010. The house was put up for sale in 2012.

The estate lets shooting rights over and adjoining Forestry Commission woodlands and fishing rights on the River Ystwyth and Teifi.

The last remaining Vaughan member to be in residence at the house was the Honourable John Edward Malet Vaughan, born 3 October 1952.  He is the youngest child of John David Malet Vaughan, 8th Earl of Lisburne, and Shelagh Macauley. Formerly a Director of Savills, John Vaughan is the Managing Director of Trawsgoed Estates, Ltd.

Lisburne Mines
The Trawsgoed estate was home to the Lisburne (Lead) Mines, one of the most profitable in all of Wales. In the 1880s, Trawsgoed had the second largest lead mine in Britain. The mineral rights extend over an extensive area and are still owned by the estate.

Notable neighbours
The estate shares a border along the River Ystwyth with that of the Hafod estate and Nanteos.

Climate
The Met Office operates a Weather Station at Trawsgoed, providing climate data for the surrounding area.
Trawsgoed experiences an oceanic climate (Köppen climate classification Cfb) similar to almost all of Wales and the United Kingdom. This translates to a narrow range of temperatures, rainfall in all seasons and low sunshine levels. Recent temperature extremes vary from  during July 2006, down to  during January 2010. Typically, just over 48 nights of the year will record an air frost, and at least 1mm of rain will be reported on 169 days. Trawsgoed holds the record for the UK's hottest November day, 22.4 °C on 1 November 2015.

Notes

References

 Crosswood Deeds, estate and family records 1527–1939 of Vaughan of Trawsgoed, later Earls of Lisburne. These deeds are calendared in Green, F. Calendar of Deeds and Documents Vol II; The Crosswood Deeds. Aberystwyth, 1927
 Plas Llangoedmore, estate records relating to Vaughan of Trawsgoed.
 The Roberts and Evans collection solicitors of Aberystwyth includes Trawsgoed C18–C20
Morgan, Gerald. The Trawsgoed Inheritance. Ceredigion: Cardiganshire Antiquarian Society, Vol 2, No 1, 1993
Morgan, Gerald. Writing an Estate and Family History: The Vaughans of Trawsgoed. Second Stages in Researching Welsh Ancestry. Edited by John & Sheila Rowlands. FFHS, 1999
Morgan, Gerald. "Ceredigion, A Wealth of History." 2005 

History of Ceredigion
Grade II* listed buildings in Ceredigion
Registered historic parks and gardens in Ceredigion
Medieval Wales
Farms in Wales
Rally GB